The Cetea is a right tributary of the river Borod in Romania. It flows into the Borod in Borozel.

References

Rivers of Romania
Rivers of Bihor County